The women's competition in the flyweight (– 48 kg) division was staged on November 21, 2009.

Schedule

Medalists

Records

Results

References
Results

- Women's 48 kg, 2009 World Weightlifting Championships
World